Diploderma swild, the Swild mountain dragon, is a species of lizard, which was first identified in China in 2019.

References 

Diploderma
Reptiles of China
Reptiles described in 2019